The Bilal Muslim Mission is an international Shi'a twelver organization, established in East Africa on December 25, 1964 through the efforts of Sayyid Saeed Akhtar Rizvi, Hussein Nasser Walji and other dedicated volunteers. The organization is named after Bilal ibn Ribah, the famous Ethiopian Sahabi.

History
When the organization was established, there were hardly any Shi'a communities of native African origin in the Sub-Saharan Africa. Now, there are several.

The website of their Tanzania branch writes:

They are now part of the World Federation of KSI Muslim Communities, an international umbrella organization that was formed in the 1976, after 1500 Shi'a twelver families emigrated from East Africa to the United Kingdom and Canada.

The carried out missionary efforts aimed at both non-Muslims and Sunni Muslims, and their efforts intensified after the Iranian Revolution.

In the late 1970s, the Bilal Muslim Mission and World Organization for Islamic Services had sent many books to America, by July 1977, about 5,770 books and booklets had been mailed out.

The Bilal Muslim Mission had been able to accomplished at lot in its objective of spreading the true teaching of Islam, through the hard work of its dedicated founders. This was achieved with very limited means and resources. Main source of spreading the true faith was person to person or through correspondence and publication of books and its dissemination. People from Guyana in South America to Poland in Europe and from Malaysia to West Africa benefitted and embraced the true Islam.

At present, 2017, the Bilal Muslim Mission of Tanzania a still trying to get its rhythm since the void left by the death of Allama Sayyid Saeed Aktar Rizvi.

The Bilal Muslim Mission is recognized by the Ministry of Overseas Indian Affairs.

Member organizations
Bilal Muslim Mission of Kenya – kenbilal.org
Bilal Muslim Mission of Tanzania – bilaltz.org
Bilal Muslim Mission Moshi Branch – bilalmoshi.com
Bilal Muslim Mission of Americas – bilalmma.org
Bilal Muslim Mission of Scandinavia – immi.se

Publications
Bi-monthly magazines: 
Sauti ya Bilal (The Voice of Bilal) to cater for the Swahili readers, since 1965.
'The light' which has global readership, since March, 1963. This magazines also spawned a book named “Muhammad is the Last Prophet”.

Books:
The Mission has more than 108 (57 English, 51 Swahili) books written on a wide range of Islamic topics.
Music and its Effects

 The Light. - Bi Monthly English Magazine first started in 1963. Bilal Muslim Mission of Tanzania
Haja ya Dini. Bilal Muslim Mission of Tanzania
The Return of Al_Mehdi. Bilal Muslim Mission of Tanzania
Justice of God. Bilal Muslim Mission of Tanzania

References

External links
power point presentation created by Sa'id Akhtar Rizvi on the World Federation of KSI Muslim Communities website.

Shia organizations
Shia Islamic websites
Islamic publishing companies